Agzibir may refer to:
 Lchap, Armenia
Agzibir, Kalbajar, Azerbaijan
Ağzıbir, Agdash, Azerbaijan